Jeng Jundian (born 1963) is a Taiwanese contemporary artist, known predominantly for his large scale works of portrait and landscape painted by layers of colorful lines; He is associated with color lines painting. He currently lives and works in Taiwan.

Biography 
Jeng Jundian was born in Kinmen, he grew up there, and came to Taiwan at the age of 19 and graduated from Taiwan National University of Arts in 1987. Jeng lived in Paris from 1996 to 1998. In 1998, Jeng returned to Taiwan and started working on his new style of painting and has since held many group or solo exhibitions, in Taiwan and in New York City. Beginning of 2014, after working for years from his home in Yangmingshan, Jeng joined the artist collective Polymer Studio (空場) when they moved into a decommissioned textile factory in Beitou, in the suburbs of Taipei. Jeng is married and has two sons.

Style
Jeng is famously associated with color lines painting; simple and unadorned pure “colored lines” are used as his basic painting unit, forming linear layers, to depict tranquil realm that include images wavering between abstract and representational, with their textures rich and their colors light and peaceful.

Exhibitions
Jeng's works have been exhibited internationally in solo or group shows. Jeng had a solo exhibition,“Another Day”, in November 2014 at Eslite Gallery, Taipei, and also took part in the 25th Anniversary Group Exhibition of that gallery that same year. Previously, he had held a larger exhibition entitled “Day In, Day Out”, also at Eslite Gallery, Taipei (2012); another solo exhibition at Eslite Gallery, Taipei(2008); a show Landscape – Cityscape, at Marlborough Gallery, New York (2005); Jeng had a duo exhibition with artist Wang Keping, Body & Nature: Two Chinese Artists, at Marlborough Gallery, New York (2004).; Taiwan Legend: Contemporary Painting in Taiwan, at Galerie Pierre, Taichung(1994).

Jeng's works are constantly shown at international art fairs such as Art Taipei, Art Beijing or Art Basel Hong Kong. In December 2018, Eslite Gallery announced that Jeng Jundian would hold a solo exhibition on their booth at the first edition of Taipei Dangdai in January 2019.

His works have been collected by Toledo Museum of Art (Ohio, USA), the White Rabbit Gallery (Sydney, Australia), Yuehu Museum of Art, Shanghai, China, Kuandu Museum of Fine Arts, Taipei, Taiwan.

See also
Line Art
Cecily Brown
Taiwanese art

References

External links
Eslite Gallery, Jeng Jundian
Feast Projects
Polymer Studio

1963 births
Living people
Taiwanese contemporary artists
Taiwan National University of Arts alumni
Taiwanese painters